The boys' 50 metre backstroke event at the 2010 Youth Olympic Games took place on August 17–18, at the Singapore Sports School.

Medalists

Semifinals

Semifinal 1

Semifinal 2

Final

References
 Semifinals Results
 Final Result

Swimming at the 2010 Summer Youth Olympics